Jacobus Willem Jonker (born 19 March 1987) is a former South African rugby union footballer that played with the  and  in Super Rugby and the , ,  and  in domestic rugby between 2006 and 2017.

Rugby career

He plays mostly as a centre.

Jonker announced his retirement in 2013 due to a chronic ankle injury, aged 25. However, he returned to the playing field in 2014 and was included in the  squad for the 2014 Super Rugby season.

He retired in 2017.

References

Living people
1987 births
South African rugby union players
Rugby union centres
Sportspeople from Bloemfontein
Afrikaner people
Pumas (Currie Cup) players
Cheetahs (rugby union) players
Free State Cheetahs players
Griffons (rugby union) players
Alumni of Grey College, Bloemfontein
Lions (United Rugby Championship) players
South Africa international rugby sevens players